Tuohey is an Irish surname and may refer to

Adrian Tuohey (born 1993), Irish hurler
Alan Tuohey (1918-1985), Australian rugby player
Mark Tuohey, American attorney

See also
 Toohey (disambiguation)
 Tuohy, a surname

Surnames of Irish origin